The 2010 Swiss Cup Basel was held October 1–4 in Arlesheim, Switzerland. It was one of three events held during Week 4 of the 2010-11 curling season on the World Curling Tour, and the third overall event of the newly dubbed European Curling Champions Tour.

The event format is a 32-team triple knockout with eight teams qualifying into a single-elimination playoff round. The total purse for the event is 45,900 Swiss francs (CHF).

Teams
 Beno Arnold
 Alexander Attinger
 Tom Brewster
 Per Carlsén
 Giorgio Da Rin
 Peter de Cruz
 Thomas Due
 Thomas Dufour
 Niklas Edin
 Pascal Eicher
 Oskar Eriksson
 Ally Fraser
 Kevin Froidevaux
 Pascal Hess
 Andy Kapp
 Thomas Lips
 Jean-Nicholas Longchamp
 Dominic Märki
 David Murdoch
 György Nagy
 Mark Neeleman
 Daniel Neuner
 Claudio Pescia
 Tomi Rantamäki
 Joel Retornaz
 Manuel Ruch
 Christof Schwaller
 David Sik
 Thomas Ulsrud
 Michal Vojtus
 Patrick Vuille
 Bernhard Werthemann

Draw

A Event

B Event

C Event

Playoffs

Quarterfinals
Sunday, October 3, 15:45 CET

Semifinals
Monday, October 4, 08:15 CET

Finals
Monday, October 4, 12:15 CET

Payout

External links
Event Website
World Curling Tour page

2010 in curling